Dahutong Subdistrict was a subdistrict situated on the southeastern corner of Hongqiao District, Tianjin, China. It borders Santiaoshi and Hongshunli Subdistricts in its north, Wanghailou Subdistrict in its east, Gulou Subdistrict in its south, and Jieyuan Subdistrict in its west. Its population was 8,239 as of 2010.

The subdistrict was formed in 1954. The name Dahutong literally means "Large Alley". The subject was disbanded in 2019, and its territory has been incorporated into Santiaoshi Subdistrict since.

Geography 
Dahutong Subdistrict situates on the south of Nanyun River and the west of Hai River.

Administrative divisions 
By 2016, Dahutong Subdistrict consisted of 9 residential communities. They are listed in the table below:

References 

Township-level divisions of Tianjin
Hongqiao District, Tianjin